Swæfberht of Essex was King of Essex (715–738). He ruled along with Saelred of Essex (709–746) who appointed him provisional king in 715.

738 deaths
East Saxon monarchs
8th-century English monarchs
Year of birth unknown